Jesús Peñarreal  was a Spanish water-colorist. (1930 in Burgos – 2008 in Benidorm)

Born in Burgos in 1930 he was given lessons according to the Burgos tradition, called the Burgos School. After his marriage he moved with his wife and his daughter and son to Benidorm at the Costa Blanca in Spain. Several exhibits of his work took place over the years in the Caja Ahorras del Mediterraneo, in short CAM. Together with other artist-painters his work was on permanent display in the largest Gallery of Altea, as long as he could be in charge. The Santa Maria Cathedral of Elche was one of his favourite subjects, but he excelled in a figurative style painting large watercolours of fishing boats in the small harbours of Altea, Benidorm, Villajoyosa or Calpe, which he always signed with J.Peñarreal and soon became known as one of the best National watercolour painters. 
The Dutch artist Hubertine Heijermans, who usually painted in that region when hibernating, lived in the same building called 'Acacias' in Benidorm, and frequently met him and they would in particular discuss the 'old masters' techniques, not only in watercolour, but also with oilpaint. They did so from 1998 until he died in 2008 after a long illness in Benidorm.

References

1930 births
2008 deaths
20th-century Spanish painters
20th-century Spanish male artists
Spanish male painters
21st-century Spanish painters
Spanish watercolourists
21st-century Spanish male artists